Opalozoa is a subphylum of heterotrophic protists of the phylum Bigyra, and is the sister group to Sagenista. Opalozoans are non-photosynthetic heterokonts that are ancestrally phagotrophic but many times have evolved to be osmotrophic saprotrophs in the gut of vertebrate animals.

Taxonomy

History: phylum Opalozoa
In 1993 the name “Opalozoa” referred to a group of protists that was very different from what it is now. It was a phylum composed of many unrelated zooflagellates, grouped together because of the common presence of tubular mitochondrial cristae and the lack of cortical alveoli or rigid tubular ciliary hairs (retronemes). It also included the opalinids, proteomyxids and plasmodiophorids.

Modern classification
The modern taxonomy of Opalozoa, down to order level, is as follows:
 Subphylum Opalozoa 
 Infraphylum Bikosia 
 Class Bikosea 
Subclass Bicosidia 
Superorder Cyathobodoniae 
Order Bicoecida 
Order Anoecida 
Order Pseudodendromonadida  
Superorder Borokiae 
Order Borokida 
Subclass Rictidia 
Order Rictida 
 Infraphylum Placidozoa 
 Superclass Wobblata  [paraphyletic]
 Class Placididea 
 Order Placidida  [=Placidae ]
 Class Nanomonadea 
 Order Uniciliatida 
 Class Opalomonadea 
 Superclass Opalinata 
 Class Opalinea 
 Order Proteromonadida 
 Order Opalinida 
 Class Blastocystea 
 Order Blastocystida 
Opalozoa incertae sedis:
 Pendulomonas 
 Bordnamonadidae

Phylogeny
The cladogram below shows the internal relationships of Opalozoa.

References

Placidozoa